Ivan Vladimirovich Tavrin (born November 1, 1976) is a Russian oligarch, investor, and founder of several major corporations. Currently he is the Chief Executive Officer of Kismet Capital Group.

Education and early career
In 1998, the Moscow-born Tavrin graduated from the Moscow State Institute of International Relations (MGIMO). During his early career, he led, established or was an investor in multiple technology, media and telecom (TMT) companies, including Regional Media Group, Media-1 Holdings, and TV-3, among others.

Career

Media-1 
In 2007, Tavrin created the Media-1 holding, formerly known as UTH Russia, and became the chairman of the board of directors of the company. As of 2021, it is one of the largest independent media holdings in Russia.

MegaFon
In 2012 he became the CEO of MegaFon, a mobile company that at the time had more than a quarter of the Russian cell phone communications market.

Kismet Capital
Tavrin founded the investment firm Kismet Capital Group in 2016 and serves as the company's CEO. He led the IPO of Kismet Acquisitions companies, which raised more than $400 million and the merger with Nexters Global Ltd.—a top game development company—which was approved in August 2021.

References

1976 births
Russian chief executives
Living people
Moscow State Institute of International Relations alumni